The Tradition (known as the Regions Tradition for sponsorship reasons) is an event on the PGA Tour Champions. First staged  in 1989, the PGA Tour recognizes the event as one of the five senior major golf championships. Unlike the U.S. Senior Open, Senior PGA Championship and Senior Open Championship, it is not recognized as a major by the European Senior Tour, and is not part of that tour's official schedule. It is the only senior major where the winner does not earn an exemption into a PGA Tour or European Tour event.

Locations

Arizona
From its inception in 1989 through 2001, the tournament was held in Arizona at the Cochise Golf Course of the Golf Club at Desert Mountain in Scottsdale. In 2002, it was held at the Prospector Course of Superstition Mountain Golf & Country Club near Gold Canyon. While in Arizona, the event was played in early April.

Oregon
In 2003, the event relocated to northwest Oregon for four years at the South Course of The Reserve Vineyards and Golf Club in Hillsboro, Oregon, just west of Portland. Following the 2006 edition, it moved to the high desert of central Oregon for four years, to the Crosswater Club in Sunriver, south of Bend. During the eight years in Oregon, the event was held in mid- to late August.

Alabama
Following the 2010 event, Birmingham, Alabama–based Regions Financial Corporation announced in August that it was taking over sponsorship of the tournament. For five years, the event was played at the Shoal Creek Golf and Country Club in the Shoal Creek development, southeast of Birmingham. 
 The Tradition superseded the Regions Charity Classic, a regular Champions Tour event which began in 1992 as the Bruno's Memorial Classic. Shoal Creek previously hosted two PGA Championships, in 1984 and 1990.

Since moving to Alabama in 2011, the event has been played in May and June. It moved from Shoal Creek to the nearby Greystone Golf and Country Club in 2016, and is held on the recently renovated Founders Course.

Winners

Multiple winners
Through 2021, five men have multiple wins in the Tradition:

4 wins:
Jack Nicklaus: 1990, 1991, 1995, 1996
2 wins: 
Gil Morgan: 1997, 1998
Fred Funk: 2008, 2010
Tom Lehman: 2011, 2012
Bernhard Langer: 2016, 2017
Steve Stricker: 2019, 2022

References

External links

Coverage on the PGA Tour Champions's official site
Greystone Golf and Country Club – official site – current venue

PGA Tour Champions events
Golf in Alabama
Golf in Arizona
Golf in Oregon
Sports in Birmingham, Alabama
Sports in Hillsboro, Oregon
Sports in Scottsdale, Arizona
Recurring sporting events established in 1989
1989 establishments in Arizona
Sports competitions in Maricopa County, Arizona